The 2013 Colgate Raiders football team represented Colgate University in the 2013 NCAA Division I FCS football season. They were led by 18th-year head coach Dick Biddle and played their home games at Andy Kerr Stadium. They were a member of the Patriot League. They finished the season 4–8, 3–2 in Patriot League play to finish in a three way tie for second place.  Biddle retired at the end of the season.

Schedule

Source: Schedule

References

Colgate
Colgate Raiders football seasons
Colgate Raiders football